Bird Day is the name of several holidays celebrating birds. Various countries observe such a holiday on various dates.

International Migratory Bird Day

International Migratory Bird Day is a conservation initiative that brings awareness on conserving migratory birds and their habitats throughout the Western Hemisphere. This program is dedicated to international conservation efforts and environmental education in Canada, the United States, Mexico, Central and South America, and the Caribbean. Originated by the Smithsonian Migratory Bird Center, it is now coordinated by Environment for the Americas.

International Migratory Bird Day officially takes place on the second Saturday in May in the U.S. and Canada and on the second Saturday of October in Mexico, Central and South America, and the Caribbean each year. Recognizing that this date does not work well for all places or for the migratory birds themselves- sites host these programs at their convenience throughout the year.

This program engages the general public to care about maintaining healthy bird populations and protecting breeding, non-breeding, and stop over habitats used by migratory birds. International Migratory Bird Day programs often are informal science education or informal science learning activities such as bird walks, art competitions, nature based festivals, and presentations. These programs take place in a variety of settings such as zoos, aquariums, protected lands, biospheres, museums, and schools.

Every year International Migratory Bird Day has a new conservation theme with corresponding artwork, educational materials, and activities.
2000: Focus on the Falcon, Artist Roger Tory Peterson
2001: Taste of the Tropics, Artist Terry Issac
2002: Exploring Habitats, Artist Charley Harper
2003: Catalysts for Conservation, Artist Gerald Sneed
2004: Conserving Colonial Birds, Artist Ram Papish
2005: Collisions, Artist David Sibley
2006: The Boreal Forest, Artist Radeaux
2007: Birds in a Changing Climate, Artist Louise Zemaitis
2008: Tundra to Tropics, Artist Eleazar Saenz
2009: Celebrate Birds In Culture, Artist Andy Everson
2010: Power of Partnerships, Artist Bob Petty   
2011: Go Wild Go Birding, Artist John Muir Laws
2012: Connecting People to Bird Conservation, Artist Rafael Lopez
2013: Life Cycle of Migratory Birds, Artist Barry Kent MacKay
2014: Why Birds Matter, Artist Elias St. Louis
2015: Restore Habitat, Restore Birds, Artist Amelia Hansen
2016: Spread Your Wings for Bird Conservation, Artist Lionel Worrell
2017: Stopover Sites, Artist Rocio Landivar
2018: Year of the Bird, Artist Paula Andrea Romero
2019: Protect Birds: Be the Solution to Plastic Pollution, Artist Arnaldo Toledo
2020: Birds Connect Our World
2021: Sing, Fly, Soar – Like a Bird!
2022: Light Pollution

Major Partners: U.S. Forest Service, Partners in Flight, U.S. Fish & Wildlife Service, Bureau of Land Management, Nature Canada, Birds & Beans, Pepco Holdings, Get To Know, US Geological Society, Ornilux, Birdzilla, Optics for the Tropics, and Society for the Conservation and Study of Caribbean Birds.

World Migratory Bird Day 
In 2006, the United Nations established World Migratory Bird Day to be held on the second weekend of May every year. The event was founded as an effort of the UN's Agreement on the Conservation of African-Eurasian Migratory Waterbirds to raise awareness of the migratory linkages between regions of the globe. World Migratory Bird Day events have been held in 118 nations. Each year, the United Nations announces a uniting theme for official events.

Bird Day and National Bird Day (United States)

Bird Day was established by Charles Almanzo Babcock, the Oil City superintendent of schools, in 1894. It was the first holiday in the United States dedicated to the celebration of birds. Babcock intended it to advance bird conservation as a moral value.  It is celebrated on May 4 of every year.

National Bird Day is an annual holiday with half a million adherents who celebrate through birdwatching, studying birds, and other bird-related activities.  Bird adoption is a particularly important National Bird Day activity. According to the newspaper Atlanta Journal-Constitution, many bird enthusiasts celebrate by adopting birds and by educating future bird owners about the special issues involved with taking care of birds, including their "screaming, biting, constant cleanups, the need for daily interaction and a varied diet". The Avian Welfare Coalition's National Bird Day campaign aims to improve the welfare of parrots and other birds by discouraging their purchase as pets, and encouraging the support of wild bird habitat conservation programs and captive bird rescue organizations and sanctuaries. National Bird Day takes place every year on January 5.

Bird Day (United Kingdom)

Since 1979, bird lovers in the United Kingdom have taken part in the annual Big Garden Birdwatch. In the annual event coordinated by the Royal Society for the Protection of Birds, up to half a million people spend an hour counting birds. In 2009 the Big Garden Birdwatch was referred to as "Bird Day" The Scotsman newspaper.

References

External links

NationalBirdDay.org
Suggestions for Bird-Day Programs by C. A. Babcock in Bird-Lore, Vol. I, (1899)
A Bird-Day Program by Elizabeth V. Brown in Bird-Lore, Vol. I, (1899)

January observances
May observances
October observances
Birds in popular culture
Types of secular holidays
Bird
Sunday observances
Holidays and observances by scheduling (nth weekday of the month)
Bird conservation